Kendra Jane Sunderland (born June 16, 1995) is an American model and pornographic film actress. She became known as "Library Girl" after a webcam video featuring an amateur performance in the Oregon State University student library went viral in 2015. In 2020, she signed a contract with the pornographic production company Brazzers.

Early life 
Sunderland graduated from West Salem High School, where she excelled academically. She planned to become a counselor or an accountant, but eventually lost interest in doing traditional office jobs. During college she worked at a diner in Lebanon, Oregon.

Career 
Sunderland signed up for a webcam site in October 2014 and made hundreds of dollars per day. She was suggested by a user to perform in a public place to earn more money and used the Oregon State University library facility, where she exposed her breasts and masturbated. An unknown person recorded the video and uploaded it to Pornhub, where it subsequently went viral. (Due to the viral circumstances, she did not expect to use her real name in her pornographic career). The University later expelled her and banned her from campus; the cam website also banned her and she faced criminal charges for public indecency and a fine of over $6,000. She pleaded guilty to the charges and paid a $1,000 fine. Her parents stopped paying her tuition once she dropped out of school.

She moved to Los Angeles, California, to have a professional career in pornography. She won a fan award for "Nicest Tits" at the inaugural Pornhub Awards in 2018, for which rapper Kanye West made sweatshirt merchandise.

References

1995 births
Living people
Oregon State University alumni
American pornographic film actresses
Webcam models
Actresses from Salem, Oregon
Pornographic film actors from Oregon
21st-century American women